Anyang Airport  is a military airport in the city of Anyang in Henan Province, China.

See also 
List of airports in China
List of the busiest airports in China

References 

Airports in Henan
Defunct airports in China
Anyang